"Tears" is a song by English electronic group Clean Bandit, featuring English singer Louisa Johnson. It was released on 27 May 2016. It is the last single to feature Neil Amin-Smith as violinist after his departure. Clean Bandit and Johnson performed the song with 5 After Midnight during the finals of The X Factor on 10 December 2016. It was included on the deluxe edition of the band's second studio album, What Is Love?

Background
Jack Patterson said: "Tears is an epic trap-2step breakup ballad. I wrote it with Sam Romans at the piano, and over the course of a year, it has transformed from a simple piano tune into a mad beast of changing time signatures and feels. To me, Tears feels like a 1990s vision of a future breakup song."

Music video
The music video features Johnson and the band in a room with burning instruments with water on the floor. The video also features a snowy owl that was one of several who had previously played Hedwig in the Harry Potter films.

Track listing

Charts and certifications

Weekly charts

Year-end charts

Certifications

References

2016 singles
2016 songs
Clean Bandit songs
Louisa Johnson songs
Number-one singles in Israel
Songs written by Romans (musician)
Songs written by Jack Patterson (Clean Bandit)
Song recordings produced by Mark Ralph (record producer)